The South Cushitic or Rift languages of Tanzania are a branch of the Cushitic languages. The most numerous is Iraqw, with half a million speakers. These languages are believed to have been originally spoken by Southern Cushitic agro-pastoralists from Ethiopia, who began migrating southward into the Great Rift Valley in the third millennium BC.

Urheimat
The original homeland of Proto-South Cushitic was in Southwest Ethiopia. South cushitic speakers then migrated south to lake Turkana and further south, entering Tanzania in 2000BC.

Classification
The Rift languages are named after the Great Rift Valley of Tanzania, where they are found.

Hetzron (1980:70ff) suggested that the Rift languages (South Cushitic) are a part of Lowland East Cushitic. Kießling & Mous (2003) have proposed more specifically that they be linked to a Southern Lowland branch, together with Oromo, Somali, and Yaaku–Dullay. Kießling & Mous suggest that these ejectives may be remnants of clicks from the source language.

The terms "South Cushitic" and "Rift" are not quite synonymous: The Ma'a and Dahalo languages were once included in South Cushitic, but were not considered Rift. Kießling restricts South Cushitic to West Rift as its only indisputable branch. He states that Dahalo has too many East Cushitic features to belong to South Cushitic, as does Ma'a. (The Waata and Degere may once have spoken languages similar to Dahalo.) Kw'adza and Aasax are in turn insufficiently described to classify as even Cushitic with any certainty.

Iraqw and Gorowa are close enough for basic mutual intelligibility. Alagwa has become similar to Burunge through intense contact, and so had previously been classified as a Southern West Rift language. Aasax and Kw'adza are poorly attested and, like Dahalo, maybe the result  of language shift from non-Cushitic languages.

Several additional and now extinct South Cushitic languages are deduced from their influence on the Bantu languages that replaced them. A pair of these, Taita Cushitic, appear to have been more divergent than extant Rift languages, co-ordinate with Proto-Rift within a larger group Nurse (1988) calls "Greater Rift".

Notes

References
BLAŽEK, Václav. 2005. Current progress in South Cushitic Comparative Historical Linguistics. Folia Orientalia 42, no. 1, pp. 177–224. (Poland. ISSN 0015-5675)
Ehret, Christopher. 1980. The Historical Reconstruction of Southern Cushitic Phonology and Vocabulary. (Kolner Beitrage zur Afrikanistik). Reimer Verlag.
Kiessling, Roland. 1995. Verbal Inflectional Suffixes in the West Rift Group of Southern Cushitic. In: Cushitic and Omotic Languages, ed. by C. Griefenow-Mewis und R. M. Voigt. Köln, 59–70.
Kiessling, Roland. 2000. Some salient features of Southern Cushitic (Common West Rift). Lingua Posnaniensis 42: 69-89
Kiessling, Roland. 2001. South Cushitic links to East Cushitic. In: New Data and New Methods in Afroasiatic Linguistics - Robert Hetzron in memoriam; ed. by Andrzej Zaborski. Wiesbaden: Harrassowitz, 95–102.
Kiessling, Roland. 2002. Wille, Initiierung und Kontrolle: zur Morphosemantik von Experiensverben im Südkuschitischen. In: Aktuelle Forschungen zu afrikanischen Sprachen (Tagungsband des 14. Afrikanistentags), ed by Theda Schumann, Mechthild Reh, Roland Kießling & Ludwig Gerhardt. Köln: Rüdiger Köppe, 171–192.
Kiessling, Roland. 2003. Infix genesis in Southern Cushitic. In: Selected Comparative-Historical Afrasian Linguistic Studies in memory of Igor M. Diakonoff; hrsg. v. Lionel M. Bender, Gabor Takacs & David Appleyard. München: Lincom, 109–122.
Kiessling, Roland. 2004. Tonogenesis in Southern Cushitic (Common West Rift). In: Stress and Tone – the African Experience, edited by Rose-Juliet Anyanwu. Frankfurter Afrikanistische Blätter 15: 141–163.
Nurse, Derek. 1988. "Extinct Southern Cushitic Communities in East Africa". In: Bechhaus-Gerst, M. & F. Serzisko (eds), Cushitic-Omotic: Papers from the International Symposium on Cushitic and Omotic Languages. St. Augustin, Jan. 6-9 1986. Hamburg. Helmut Buske. 93–104.
Roland Kießling and Maarten Mous. 2003. The Lexical Reconstruction of West-Rift (Southern Cushitic)

External links
Was there ever a Southern Cushitic Language (Pre-)Ma'a?